Navneet Nishan (also known as Navnit Nishan, Navnit or Navnit Singh) (born 25 October 1965) is an Indian actress. She is best known for her role as Tara in the soap opera Tara, and Kasautii Zindagii Kay. She has also worked in the TV serial Chanakya as Shonotra. She has acted in a number of Punjabi movies as well. Her most notable work includes the Punjabi film Ardab Mutiyaran.

Nishan made her Bollywood debut in the movie Jaan Tere Naam along with Ronit Roy as a supporting actress followed by Dilwale, Yeh Lamhe Judaai Ke, Jee Aayan Nu, Asa Nu Maan Watna Da, Hum Hain Rahi Pyaar Ke, Raja Hindustani, Akele Hum Akele Tum, Tum Bin and Aapko Pehle Bhi Kahin Dekha Hai.

Filmography

Films

Television

Web series

References

External links

Indian film actresses
Actresses in Hindi cinema
Indian television actresses
Living people
1965 births
Actresses in Hindi television
20th-century Indian actresses
21st-century Indian actresses